Jean-Michel Delpech (French pronunciation: [ʒɑ̃ miʃɛl dɛlpɛʃ]; 26 January 19462 January 2016), known as Michel Delpech, was a French singer-songwriter and actor.

Family
Jean-Michel Bertrand Delpech was born the 26th january of 1946 in Courbevoie, a city located nearby the parisian suburbs. Born during the baby boom, he’s the son of Bertrand Charles Delpech, a metal chrome plater and Christiane Cécile Marie Josselin, housewife. He has got 2 little sisters : Catherine and Martine. 

His maternal family (Josselin) is a winegrower family, owner and harvesters of champagne in Gyé-Sur-Seine in the Aube department. His father's ancestral home is in Sologne, more especially in Dhuizon, where his hairdresser grandfather lives and also in La Ferté-Saint-Cyr, where live his uncles and cousins grocers, loggers and farmers. The young Michel spends week-ends and holidays in his provincial family, sometimes working in the grocery store of his aunt.

Career debuts 
Its parents having moved to Cormeilles-en-Parisis in Seine-et-Oise (today known as Val-d’Oise), Jean-Michel Delpech studied in the Chabanne college and in the Pontoise’s Camille-Pissarro high-school from 1961 to 1964.

As a teenager he got passionate about famous classic fingers such as Luis Mariano, and then for the great names from the 1950s such as Gilbert Nécaud and Charles Aznavour. In 1963, in high school, he created a little orchestra with his schoolmates.

Before attending his final high school exams, he left high school in january 1964 to focus on singing. He took a chance by attending an audition in Paris to join the disque Vogue record company. Just aged 18, he released his first disc named Anatole, and met the composer Roland Vincent. While going to Roland’s house based in Saint-Cloud for a working session, he rethinks about his highschool years and about the coffee he used to go with his mates after the school day. In the train, between Saint Lazare and Saint Cloud train station, he writes the lyrics of Chez Laurette, for which Roland Vincent felt seduced and inspired and quickly found a melody. Released the 1st of May 1965, during the yéyé period, this nostalgic teenager music wasn't a success at its release but thanks to the numerous radio streams, started to experience a slight celebrity.

In 1965, Michel Delpech attended a musical comedy Copains-Clopant, which was featured for 6 months, before at the Michodière theater and then at the Gymnase Theater in Paris : the integration of the Chez Laurette Music helped him to be famous. During this musical comedy, Delpech meets Chantal SImon, who he sang a song with. Then he’ll marry her at the age of 20 in 1966.

The same year, under the Festival Label, he recorded its 2nd 45 laps : Inventaire 1966, new stepping stone towards the star status. As Jacques Prévert and as a tribute to the poetry, he compiles in the verse of the music, a list of news such as the Vietnam war, the minijupe, the Courrèges boots, the Cacharel trend, the flower shirts,etc. Still in 1966, he made the first part during 38 shows of Jacques Brell who said goodbye to the Olympia.

Succes
In 1967, Jonny Stack, Mireille Mathieu’s manager takes Michel Delpech in charge and helps him to build up his star image. As the opener of “La chanteuse d’Avignon”, he starts a international tour from West Germany, to USSR and United States. Same year, he quits the Festival record company et moves to Barclay.

In 1968, he receives the Grand prix of the French song award, for his song “il y a des jours où on ferait mieux de rester au lit”,  (there are some days where you’d better stay in bed) written with Jean Jacques Debout      

It’s an ear of success, in France and abroad : Wight is Wight (novembre 1969) (in memory of rock Festival of the Wight island, Et Paul chantait yesterday (“And Paul was singing Yesterday), (tribute to the Beatles who are splitting apart), Pour un flirt (“just a fling”) (mai 1971). Wight is Wight, right in the Hippie era, is being sold at more than a million pieces in Europe.

The very Romantic Pour un flirt is a hit in French speaking countries, also. In the Netherlands, his German version is hitting he charts in West Germany, Austria, and Switzerland.  In just 4 months, more than 4Millions units are being sold. The singer himself is surprised: “I didn’t expect the verses big potentials, will he said.

In 1970, the singer leaves his manager Jonnhy Starck to benefit a much wider artistic liberty, and 2 years later, stops his collaboration with Rolland Vincent looking for other writers.

Now a big star, he’s playing at the Olympia, during 3 weeks in a row in January 1972

In 1973, his breakup with Chantal Somin (who left him) and his co-writer Jean Michel Rivat break up with Christine Haas inspire him the song Les Divorcés, where he speaks about peaceful break up, whereas it’s actually really painful. As this songs contrasts with the usual breezy and happy tone of previous Michel  Delpech songs, Barclay company is afraid this song will have a negative iompact on the singer, and they are very hesitating to release the song. The yfinally accept. Good for them, it’s a success with more than hundred of thousands sales. The impact of the lyrics on the society is so big that the mutual agreement divorce law will be adopted 3 years later.

From 1973, success after success, with Que Marianne était jolie, Le Chasseur (1974),or Quand j'étais chanteur (1975),

In 1977, he sings Le Loir-et-Cher, song that speaks with tenderness and irony about Loire et Cher inhabitants, where he was born. « On dirait que ça te gêne de marcher dans la boue, on dirait que ca te gêne de dîner avec nous » « looks like you don’t want to walk in the mud, looks like you don’t want to have dinner with us” is an illustration of the sometime hard and difficult relationship between cities and country sides.

Career
He was born in Courbevoie, France. In 1963, Delpech released his debut hit "Anatole" on Disques Vogue. In 1964, Delpech met Roland Vincent, and a long singing songwriting partnership ensued, with Delpech being signed to Festival French record label.

In 1965, he took part in the music comedy Copains Clopant that had a six-month run and made him popular, particularly through his interpretation of "Chez Laurette". He was the opening act for Jacques Brel's goodbye concert at the Paris Olympia. In 1967, he collaborated with Johnny Stark. In 1968, he won the "Grand Prix du Disque" award for "Il y a des jours où on ferait mieux de rester au lit".

Then he left Vogue to sign with Barclay Records. At the peak of his success, he recorded "Wight Is Wight" in tribute to the Isle of Wight Festival, a famous rock festival on the Isle of Wight that became his best known song. It sold over one million copies in Europe, and was awarded gold disc status.

'Pour Un Flirt' was a second smash hit. It charted in the French-speaking countries around the globe as well in the Netherlands, and a version in German brought him charts success in West Germany, Austria and Switzerland. An English translation, Flirt, made the Top 20 in the UK.

The early 1970s brought separation from Johnny Stark for two years, and the end of the long collaboration with Roland Vincent, his first-ever writer. He had some new releases but with limited success. In the 1980s, he enjoyed a comeback and released the album Loin d'ici. A compilation album followed in 1989. He continued releasing albums and making concerts. In December 2006, he released an album of duets Michel Delpech and that topped the French Albums Chart for one week (week of 21–27 January 2007). He also engaged on a French tour.

Personal life
In 1966, he met Chantal Simon whom he married. Later on the couple divorced, and Delpech suffered depression. He searched for relief in religions, mainly Buddhism and later the Catholic faith.
In the 1970s, there were also many rumours about attempted suicides, but he denied these rumours in a later biography.
In 1983, he met Geneviève Garnier-Fabre, a French artist and they married in 1985.
In 1990, he had a son, Emmanuel. He became a talented guitarist and joined his father in his concerts since 2007.
In 2007, Pascal Louvrier wrote a biography about him titled Michel Delpech - Mis à Nu published on Editions Perrin.
In 2011, he played the role of Françoit Gouriot in Beloved (French title: Les Bien-aimés)
In 2011, he was a guest of honor for the sixth season of Âge tendre et Têtes de bois broadcast in France, Belgium and Switzerland.

Death
Delpech had long been a heavy smoker, going through a pack of cigarettes daily starting at the age of 18 and quitting only after his diagnosis to throat cancer in 2013. He died at a hospital in Puteaux, France on 2 January 2016 at the age of 69.

Discography

Albums
 1966: Inventaire 66
 1969: Il y a des jours où on ferait mieux de rester au lit
 1970: Album
 1974: Le chasseur
 1975: Quand j'étais chanteur
 1979: 5000 kilomètres
 1986: Oubliez tout ce que je vous ai dit
 1991: Les Voix du Brésil
 1997: Le roi de rien
 1999: Cadeau de Noël
 2004: Comme Vous
 2006: Michel Delpech &
 2009: Sexa

Compilations
 1990: J'étais un ange
 1999: Fan de toi (2 CDs)
 2008: Fan de toi (3 CDs)
 2008: Les 100 plus belles chansons
 2009: Best of

Live albums
 1972: Olympia 1972
 2005: Ce lundi-là au Bataclan
 2007: Live au Grand Rex

Singles
Disques Vogue
1964: "Anatole"
1965: "Chez Laurette"
Festival
1964 : "Elle se moque de toi"
1965 : "Copains Clopants" (with Chantal Simon)
1965 : "Chez Laurette" (rereleased in 1970 and with Musidisc in 1978)
1965 : "T'en fais pas"
1965 : "Plus d'bac"
1966 : "Marie-toi Marie Jo" (rereleased in 1970)
1966 : "Inventaire 66"
1966 : "Quand on aime comme on s'aime"
1966 : "Le restaurant chinois" (rereleased in 1970)
1967 : "La Femme de l'an 3000"

Barclay
1967 : "Il faut regarder les étoiles"
1967 : "Pour un coin de Pologne"
1968 : "Poupée cassée"
1968 : "Les p'tits cailloux blancs"
1969 : "Le Mauvais Jardinier"
1969 : "Wight Is Wight"
1969 : "Quand la pluie tombe en été"
1970 : "Chérie-Lise"
1970 : "Un coup de pied dans la montagne"
1971 : "Le blé en herbe"
1971 : "La Vie, La Vie"
1971 : *Pour un flirt
1972 : "Quand un soldat reviens"
1972 : "Même pendant la guerre on chante"
1972 : "Fan de toi"
1972 : "Que Marianne était jolie"
1973 : "Rimbaud chanterait"
1973 : "Les divorcés"
1973 : "Les aveux"
1973 : "Je pense à toi"
1974 : "Je l'attendais"
1974 : "Le chasseur (Les oies sauvages)"
1975 : "Quand j’étais chanteur"
1976 : "Ce lundi-là"
1976 : "Tu me fais planer"
1976 : "La fille avec des baskets"
1977 : "Fais un bébé"
1977 : "Le Loir et Cher"
1978 : "C’est ta chanson" (remake of "Your Song")
1979 : "Trente manières de quitter une fille" (remake of "50 Ways To Leave Your Lover")
1979 : "Je cherche un endroit"
1980 : "Docker"
1981 : "Bombay"
1983 : "Animaux animaux"
1984 : "Loin d'ici"

Pathé-Marconi / EMI / Charles Talar Records
1985 : "Rock en U.R.S.S."
1986 : "J'peux pas dormir"
1986 : "Oubliez tout ce que je vous ai dit"
1987 : "Petite France"
1988 : "Ces mots-là"

Carrère
1988 : "Fais glisser tes bas... ces mots-là"

Tréma
1989 : "Pleurer le chanteur"
1990 : "J'étais un ange"
1991 : "Les voix du Brésil"
1992 : "Terre d'amour"

References

External links

Michel Delpech site on Universal Music France

1946 births
2016 deaths
Burials at Père Lachaise Cemetery
Deaths from cancer in France
Deaths from throat cancer
French male singers
People from Courbevoie